Chester James Carville Jr. (born October 25, 1944) is an American political consultant, author, and occasional actor who has strategized for candidates for public office in the United States and in at least 23 nations abroad. A Democrat, he is an expert pundit in U.S. elections who appears frequently on cable news programs, podcasts, and public speeches.

Nicknamed the "Ragin' Cajun", Carville gained national attention for his work as a lead strategist in Bill Clinton's winning 1992 Presidential campaign. Carville also had a principal role crafting strategy for three unsuccessful Democratic Party presidential contenders, including Massachusetts Senator John Kerry in 2004, New York Senator Hillary Clinton in 2008, and Colorado Senator Michael Bennet's campaign for the Democratic Party presidential nomination in 2020.

Early life and education
Carville was born on October 25, 1944, at a U.S. Army hospital at Georgia's Fort Benning, where his father was stationed during World War II. His mother, Lucille (née Normand), stayed behind in Carville, Louisiana, where James was raised, but went to Ft. Benning long enough to have her firstborn son. Carville would later note: "We were availing ourselves to free government health services." Lucille Carville, a former school teacher, spoke French at home, and sold the World Book Encyclopedia door-to-door, and his father, Chester James Carville Sr., was a postmaster as well as owner of a general store.

Carville, Louisiana, a neighborhood in the city of St. Gabriel, in Iberville Parish, located sixteen miles south of the capital city of Baton Rouge on the Mississippi River, was named after his paternal grandfather, Louis Arthur Carville, who was once the postmaster. Louis Arthur's mother, Octavia Dehon, was of Belgian parentage and had married John Madison Carville, described in a biography as "Irish-born" and a "carpetbagger," both of whom established the general store operated by the family in Carville, in 1882. Carville has seven siblings (Bonnie, Mary Ann, Gail, Pat, Steve, Bill, and Angela.).

Among Carville's earliest political campaign work was ripping down the campaign signs of a candidate for public office during his high school years. Carville graduated from Ascension Catholic High School in Donaldsonville, Louisiana, in 1962.

He attended Louisiana State University (LSU) from 1962 to 1966, but did not graduate at that time. In a 1994 feature in Newsweek, Carville characterized himself as "something less than an attentive scholar. I had fifty-six hours' worth of Fs before LSU finally threw me out."

Carville served a two year enlistment in the United States Marine Corps, from 1966 to 1968, where he was stationed stateside, at Camp Pendleton in San Diego. He achieved the rank of Corporal.

Following the conclusion of his military enlistment, Carville finished his studies at LSU at night, where he earned his Bachelor of Science degree in General Studies in 1970 and his Juris Doctor degree in 1973. Carville is a member of the Sigma Nu fraternity. He later worked as a junior high school science teacher. Before entering politics, Carville worked as an attorney at McKernnan, Beychok, Screen and Pierson, a Baton Rouge law firm, from 1973 to 1979.

Political consulting in the United States 1970s to 1990s 
Carville was trained in consulting by Gus Weill, who in 1958 had opened the first advertising firm that specialized in political campaigns in the state capital in Baton Rouge.

East Baton Rouge Parish, 1970s and 1980s 
In a 2012 piece he wrote for Foreign Affairs, Carville described one of his earliest political jobs distributing 'hate sheets' with negative literature on a political opponent at grocery stores on behalf of Ossie Bluege Brown, during Brown's 1972 campaign for district attorney of East Baton Rouge Parish. Two years earlier, Brown had defended Staff Sergeant David Mitchell, the first of 17 soldiers charged in connection with the deaths of villagers during the Mỹ Lai massacre. Brown's tenure as D.A. was marked by his crusades against narcotics and pornography. In 1973, Brown prevented Baton Rouge theaters from showing Bernardo Bertolucci's X-rated film, Last Tango in Paris, In 1979, Brown blocked the showing of the comedy, Monty Python's Life of Brian. Brown asked Baton Rouge magazine distributors not to offer the March 1977 issue of Hustler, which a state court judge in Ohio ruled obscene.

In addition to his work as an attorney, in the late 1970s, Carville also worked for Gus Weill & Ray Strother's Weill-Strother, a Baton-Rouge-based political consulting firm that, over the years, had assisted with electoral campaigns and political messaging for Louisiana governors Jimmie Davis, John McKeithen, Edwin Edwards, and U.S. Representative Otto Passman.

In the early 1980s, Carville served as executive assistant to East Baton Rouge Parish mayor-president Pat Screen.

In early 1985, Carville consulted to help Cathy Long win a special election to central Louisiana's now defunct 8th congressional district, following the death of her husband, Gillis William Long, of Louisiana's Long family political dynasty.

Texas senate race, 1984

In 1984, Carville became acquainted with his consulting partner Paul Begala when Carville managed then Texas state legislator Lloyd Doggett's unsuccessful campaign for the open Texas Senate seat. Carville helped Doggett, an unabashed liberal and committed enemy of special interests, secure the Democratic nomination in a primary that included conservative U.S. Representative Kent Hance, and centrist former congressman Bob Krueger. During the primary, Carville borrowed a rubber vertebrae exhibit from a friend who was a personal injury attorney, and coached Doggett on using it as a prop on the stump to attack Krueger as a political flip flopper who lacked resolve and 'backbone.' 

During the general election, Doggett's opponent, Phil Gramm, leveraged vicious identity-based attacks on Doggett. On one occasion, Doggett ended up returning small dollar fundraising he received from a gay rights group. Gramm emphasized themes of "family values," including his insistence at a June 1984 prayer breakfast on "having people who believe in Christianity in charge of government," and Carville counter-punched that theme as anti-semitic. Doggett was defeated in the general election, polling 2,207,557 votes (41.5 percent), to Gramm's 3,116,348 votes (58.5 percent).

Finding himself out of work after the November 1984 defeat, Carville recalled, "I was scared to death, I was 40 years old, and didn't have any health insurance, I didn't have any money, I was mortified."

Pennsylvania gubernatorial election, 1986

During the 1986 general election, Carville helped Bob Casey Sr. win election as the 42nd Governor of Pennsylvania by defeating his Democratic primary opponent, Ed Rendell, in early 1986, and general election opponent Dick Thornburgh's lieutenant governor, Bill Scranton, who had taken the lead in the polls after announcing that his campaign was pulling all negative ads, and challenged Casey to do the same. However, the Scranton campaign misstepped by sending a mailer to 600,000 Republican voters that featured a letter from Scranton's father. An additional brochure harshly attacking Casey's ethics was also included. Carville began counterpunching; he contacted journalists and characterized the mailer as outrageous. Scranton claimed that he did not know about the mailing, so Carville ordered 600,000 blank envelopes, loaded them up on a truck – mountains of envelopes – and dumped them on a street corner near Scranton's campaign headquarters. Television cameras captured the campaign, asking: "How could you send out this many envelopes and not know about it?" Three weeks before the election, a poster appeared statewide, depicting Scranton as a "long-haired, dope smoking hippie." The race was virtually tied until five days before the election, when Carville launched the "guru," a TV commercial that portrayed Scranton as having been a regular drug user during the 1960s, also mocking Scranton's interest in transcendental meditation and his ties to Maharishi Mahesh Yogi. The image of Scranton as a meditating, long haired, dope-smoking hippie, with a background of sitar music, was credited with tipping the scales against Scranton in the socially conservative rural sections of Pennsylvania where Carville selectively decided to run the "guru" TV commercial. Casey went on to win the election by a narrow margin of 79,216 out of 3.3 million total votes cast.

Kentucky gubernatorial contest, 1987

In 1987, Carville worked as a campaign manager to cast Kentucky businessman Wallace Wilkinson as a self-made millionaire anti-establishment gubernatorial candidate. Wilkinson, who had made his fortune in retail, and real estate development, and who was sued for not paying overtime to his employees, and refused to release his tax returns to the public, charged his Democratic primary opponents with wanting to raise taxes, and continually campaigned on creating a state lottery to raise public revenue. During the general election portion of the campaign, on September 25th, 1987, Carville appeared on WLEX-TV's 'Your Government' public affairs program, and implored reporters to look into the background of Wilkinson's opponent John Harper's family, noting: "there might be problems with some of Harper's children." After the incident, Harper confirmed that his son had been shot and killed by Franklin County, Ohio police during a 1978 pharmacy robbery. Wilkinson won the general election polling 504,674 votes (64.5%) to Harper's 273,141 (34.91%), and as Kentucky's 57th governor, secured passage of a state constitutional amendment to allow a lottery.

Georgia gubernatorial contest, 1990

In 1989 and 1990, Carville assisted conservative Democrat and four term lieutenant governor Zell Miller in winning the state party's gubernatorial nomination in a five candidate contest that included Atlanta Mayor Andrew Young, then-state senator Roy Barnes, and former governor Lester Maddox.

Miller campaigned on a platform of shock incarceration boot camps for first time drug offenders, blasted Young for "an explosion of crime" in Atlanta, and painted Young with wanting to "run away from" the issue of drugs. At Carville's counseling, Miller made a state lottery in lieu of state tax increases a central theme of his campaign. Carville attributed Miller's eleven point primary victory over Young to the attraction of the lottery issue and its capacity to turn out white suburban voters. "Zell Miller was able to set the agenda, and the agenda was the lottery," Carville noted at the time.

Miller won the nominating contest in the August, 1990 runoff against Young, and later defeated Johnny Isakson in the November, 1990 general election. Miller was later a keynote speaker at the 1992 Democratic National Convention and 2004 Republican National Conventions.

Texas gubernatorial election, 1990

Carville consulted in 1990 for former Texas Congressman and sitting state Attorney General Jim Mattox, a bare-knuckled political brawler who routinely traveled to Huntsville to attend state executions in Texas, the most active state in carrying out the death penalty. On advice from Carville, Mattox who was seeking the Democratic gubernatorial nomination that year, based his campaign on the claim that a state lottery would solve Texas' revenue needs without additional state taxes.

With no facts to support the charge, Mattox also ran a television advertisement accusing his primary opponent, State Treasurer Ann Richards a recovering alcoholic, as a cannabis and cocaine user who might falter in fulfilling the responsibilities of being governor. In losing the nominating contest to Richards, Mattox gained a reputation as a combative campaigner.

Pennsylvania special senatorial election, 1991 

In 1991, Carville consulted for Harris Wofford in his run for the open U.S. Senate seat left vacant when Senator John Heinz was killed in an April, 1991 plane crash. Following the crash, Carville, who was by then a close political confidant of Governor Casey, hatched a plan to offer his appointment of the Senate seat to Chrysler chairman Lee Iacocca, an Allentown native who declined the offer within 24 hours. Attorney and later Pittsburgh Steelers owner Art Rooney II was also considered, but Casey ultimately decided to appoint Wofford, then his state Secretary of Labor, to fill the seat, and Wofford faced a special election in November of that year.

Against the national backdrop of the first Gulf War, and a dour economy, Wofford's general election opponent, George H.W. Bush's sitting U.S. Attorney General, Dick Thornburgh, was widely seen as a surrogate of the Bush political machine, and the contest was widely viewed as an early referendum on Bush's reelection prospects the following year.

Wofford was one of the first whites to graduate from Howard University school of law, travelled to India and wrote a book on Gandhi, co-founded the Peace Corps, and was arrested at the 1968 Democratic National Convention for disorderly conduct, and was an opponent of apartheid. A philosophical progressive, and college president, he had served as an aide to both John F. Kennedy, and a friend and adviser to Martin Luther King Jr. Wofford had the air of an "anti-politician," rumpled in appearance, and uncomfortable with small talk who ran a campaign with themes of economic populism.

Though the issue polled a distant 5th in voter concerns, Wofford himself eschewed guidance from his consultants in demanding national health insurance be the centerpiece of his campaign. With the assistance of a guild of Philadelphia ophthalmologists, Wofford crafted an impactful slogan: "If criminals have access to a lawyer, working Americans should have a right to a doctor."

During the race, Carville helped Wofford craft an aggressive campaign, 
 with television advertisements attacking Thornburgh for taking expensive flights at public expense in government jets to junkets in places such as Hawaii. Another Wofford campaign commercial evoked an anti-establishmentarian air, linking Thornburgh to "the mess in Washington."

In the months leading into the election, Wofford overcame Thornburgh's 44 point lead in the polls and defeated him in November, garnering 1,860,760 votes (55 percent), to Thornburgh's 1,521,986 (45 percent).

Carville again consulted for Wofford's re-election campaign in 1994 when he was narrowly defeated by Republican Rick Santorum.

Los Angeles mayoral election, 1992–1993 

In late 1992, and early 1993, Carville consulted for San Fernando Valley state assemblyman Richard Katz in his run for the open 1993 Los Angeles mayoral election, which was the first time in 63 years that an incumbent mayor didn't appear on the ballot. Katz ran on a tough-on-crime platform that included gun control, including new sales taxes on firearms and ammunition, and selling-off city-owned infrastructure, such as the Ontario International Airport, to pay police overtime, while promising not to raise property taxes. Despite retaining Carville, and spending a million dollars on campaign television commercials, Katz finished behind three other candidates, garnering 46,173 votes, or 9.73% of 474,366 total votes cast in the nonpartisan blanket mayoral primary, and did not advance to the general election.

Bill Clinton's 1992 presidential campaign 

In 1992, Carville helped lead Bill Clinton to a win against George H. W. Bush in the presidential election. In crafting an economic strategy for Clinton, Carville reprised the populist rhetoric his client, Pennsylvania Senator Harris Wofford, successfully wielded the prior year, which was distilled into a series of articles Donald L. Barlett and James B. Steele wrote for The Philadelphia Inquirer. The articles were re-printed into book form: America: What Went Wrong? which became a prop Clinton brandished effectively from the stump during a time of economic recession. In bringing in the series of articles from the Wofford campaign, Carville imported an angry left-wing populism as a campaign theme.

One of the formulations he used in that campaign has entered common usage, derived from a list he posted in the campaign war room to help focus himself and his staff, with these three points:

 Change vs. more of the same.
The economy, stupid.
 Don't forget health care.
 
Carville sought to shield Clinton from Gennifer Flowers' allegations of her extramarital sexual affair which emerged shortly before the 1992 New Hampshire Democratic primary. Carville alleged that Flowers was paid $175,000 by a supermarket tabloid for sharing her story, and that "the mainstream media got sucker-punched" by her allegations. Carville set out to shame the press, berating reporters with charges of "cash for trash" journalism, and noted: "I'm a lot more expensive than Gennifer Flowers.". Flowers later brought a civil suit against Carville in 1999 (see below).

In June 1992, trailing George H. W. Bush and Ross Perot in the polls, Clinton limped toward the national convention, while the Los Angeles riots crowded him out of news coverage. Carville knew he needed to bring Clinton back into the news limelight. He did so by orchestrating Clinton's splashy criticism of hip hop artist Sister Souljah in a prepared speech Clinton delivered at the Rainbow Coalition's June 1992 "Rebuild America" conference in Washington, DC. Sister Souljah had remarked: "If black people kill black people every day, why not have a week and kill white people?" Clinton responded in his speech by saying, "If you took the words, 'white' and 'black' and you reversed them, you might think David Duke was giving that speech." Clinton refuted the suggestion that his speech was a calculated attempt to appeal to moderate and conservative swing voters by standing up to a core Democratic constituency. The speech had the effect of opening up a public war between Clinton and Jesse Jackson.

In 1993, Carville was honored as Campaign District Manager of the Year by the American Association of Political Consultants. His role in the Clinton campaign was documented in the feature-length Academy Award-nominated film The War Room.

American politics during the 1990s

Carville continued to serve the Democratic National Committee in a political capacity during the 1990s, and had an ongoing need to regularly visit the White House to speak with then President Bill Clinton on political matters. Accordingly, Carville was once one of only twenty individuals at the time who was granted a permanent "Non-Government Service" security badge, which were used for non-government employees, such as contractors, who needed regular access to the White House grounds. In consideration for the privilege of the permanent pass, the Clinton Administration asked Carville to submit to a full security clearance style FBI background check.

In response to the 1997 civil lawsuit then Arkansas state employee Paula Jones filed against Bill Clinton over her claims of sexual harassment while attending a conference on official business, Carville infamously remarked: "Drag a hundred dollars through a trailer park and there's no telling what you'll find." South Carolina U.S. Senator Lindsey Graham later made reference to Carville's trailer park line during the 2018 Brett Kavanaugh SCOTUS confirmation hearings in reference to Dr. Christine Blasey Ford. During an October, 2018 interview with Michael Smerconish on CNN, on the topic of Graham alluding to Carville's "drag $100", Carville remarked that, at the time, "I was making a joke", and added "I'm always complimented when people use my lines; you always like to leave a little legacy out there."

In 1999, Gennifer Flowers, who had previously alleged an affair with Carville's 1992 client Bill Clinton, sued Carville and his colleague George Stephanopoulos for defamation of character. In 2000, Flowers additionally named Hillary Clinton as a defendant in the suit. Attorney Larry Klayman of Judicial Watch, a conservative advocacy organization, represented her in the suit. Flowers contended that Carville and Stephanopoulos ignored obvious warning signs that news media reporting did not conclusively determine that tapes of her recorded telephone conversations with Clinton were "doctored." In 2004, a federal district court dismissed the case with summary judgment. Klayman then appealed the case on Flowers' behalf. In 2006, 14 years after the allegations of the affair became an issue for Bill Clinton's first presidential campaign, the U.S. Court of Appeals for the 9th Circuit affirmed the lower court's dismissal.

International elections 1990s to 2010s
Beginning in the mid-1990s, Carville worked on a number of election campaigns abroad, including those of Tony Blair, then Prime Minister of the United Kingdom, during the 2001 general election (in which Blair was comfortably re-elected), and with the Liberal Party of Canada.

Carville viewed working campaigns abroad as more commercially lucrative, and with less reputational risk than campaigns in the United States noting in 2009: "If you help elect a president and then you get involved in a governor's race and you lose, it's going to be a little bit damaging to your reputation. But if you go to Peru and you run a presidential race and you lose, no one knows or cares. So why go to New Jersey and lose for 100 grand when you can go to Peru and lose for a million?" 

Carville has been less forthcoming to the news media about his work abroad, and remarked to a Los Angeles Times reporter in 1999, "I won't comment on anything I do outside the U.S."

Work with U.S. State Department 
In 2002, on behalf of the U.S. State Department, Carville, and his wife, political consultant Mary Matalin, met with a group of 55 Arab women political leaders during the 2002 United States midterm elections. The programming, "Women as Political Leaders" International Visitor (IV) Program", was the first program implemented under the auspices of the Middle East Partnership Initiative, a collection of 40 programs headed by then deputy assistant secretary for Near East Affairs Liz Cheney. In addition to events with Carville and Matalin, the group met with congressional, state and local campaign staff, and observed campaign work during their visits to Concord, New Hampshire, Dallas, Texas, Detroit, Michigan, Toledo, Ohio, Raleigh, North Carolina, and Tallahassee and Tampa, Florida.

That year, Carville also proposed visiting Arab and Muslim nations on behalf of the US government to do "some kind of propaganda," adding "I'd love to use my experience and skills to tell people about my country and what's available to them beyond hopelessness and terrorism." He added, "What the terrorists are after is the younger and increasingly poor population. What they are offering is not that much, but we are not doing a good job telling those young people the other side of the story. It's time we told them about choices they have without imposing American values."

Greece, 1993 

Carville, Begala, and Mary Matalin advised incumbent Greek Prime Minister Konstantinos Mitsotakis in an election that saw local Greek press allege United States interference in the election. Unpopular because his program of economic austerity and privatization, Mitsotakis failed in his reelection bid, and lost to democratic socialist Andreas Papandreou.

Brazil, 1994 

In 1994, Carville consulted for Fernando Henrique Cardoso in his successful 1994 campaign for the Brazilian presidency. Cardoso, a professor and Fulbright Fellow lectured in the United States during the 1980s at Columbia University on issues of democracy in Brazil. Cardoso, often nicknamed "FHC", was elected with the support of a heterodox alliance of his own Social Democratic Party, the PSDB, and two right-wing parties, the Liberal Front Party (PFL) and the Brazilian Labour Party (PTB). During his tenure in office, Cardoso's administration liquidated public assets and deepened the privatization of government-owned enterprises in steel milling, telecommunications and mining, along with making reforms to Brazil's social security income program and tax systems.

Honduras, 1997 

In 1997, Carville consulted for then leader of the National Congress of Honduras, Carlos Flores Facussé in his presidential campaign. Flores attended the American School of Tegucigalpa, studied international finance at Louisiana State University in the early 1970s, and married a U.S. citizen from Tennessee. 

He later became the publisher of his family's La Tribuna, a leading Honduran newspaper, and served on various corporate boards of directors, including the Central Bank of Honduras, and became involved in politics. Flores was aligned with former president Roberto Suazo Cordova's Rodista faction, the more conservative wing of the liberal party. Vowing to move Honduras past its image of being primarily a banana and coffee exporter, Flores campaigned on his "New Agenda" platform, that included a ten point plan to stabilize the economy. Flores distanced himself from the outgoing Reina administration, while successfully portraying himself as an opposition candidate from the same party.

In the November, 1997 general election, Flores faced National party candidate Nora Gúnera de Melgar, the wife of General Juan Alberto Melgar Castro, who seized power in a 1975 coup which removed then president Oswaldo López Arellano after his bananagate bribery scandal with United Fruit Company.

Flores defeated his opponent by a 10% margin of 195,418 votes out of a total of 1,885,388 votes cast. Gúnera de Melgar's campaign was aided by the assistance Dick Morris, rival political consultant and also a political adviser to Bill Clinton. Morris claimed he had no knowledge of Carville's involvement with his opponent until after the election.

In October, 1998, Hurricane Mitch devastated Honduras, and post hurricane reconstruction efforts resulted in international development banks renegotiating much of Honduras' external debt in exchange for structural adjustment policies. After selling state-owned airports and energy companies, Flores unsuccessfully attempted to privatize Hondutel, the state-owned telephone utility, and when that effort failed, the International Monetary Fund froze the distribution of loans and demanded that the government further accelerate its privatization programs.

Ecuador, 1998 

In 1998, Carville help craft a successful strategy to elect Jamil Mahuad Witt as President of Ecuador. Mahuad, an Ecuadorian-born attorney, earned a Master of Public Administration from Harvard Kennedy School, where he was Mason Fellow. He was also a US State Department-sponsored Fulbright Fellow, who lectured in ethics and politics at several universities.

Mahuad was elected Mayor of Quito in the 1990s before retaining the services of Carville to help him win the Ecuadorian presidency, in a campaign in which Mahuad touted his educational background at Harvard Kennendy School.

In the wake of an economic crisis from falling oil prices and stagnant economic growth, Mahuad decreed a state of emergency, and embarked on austerity measures to stifle rampant inflation, including sales tax and gasoline tax increases, freezing bank account withdrawals, and the dollarization of the economy which included the sudden voiding and invalidation of the Sucre, Ecuador's currency since 1884. In January 2000, Mahuad was forced from office in a military coup following demonstrations by Ecuadorians. Mahuad fled to exile in the United States. In 2014, an Ecuadorian court convicted Mahuad, in absentia, of embezzlement during his time in office, and sentenced him to twelve years in prison. Interpol also issued a warrant for his arrest.

Panama, 1998 

In 1998, the Democratic Revolutionary Party (PRD) party in Panama retained Carville as their main adviser to help re-elect then term-limited President Ernesto Pérez Balladares during an election where opposition figures suggested that Perez Balladares was hoping to convey the impression that the Clinton Administration in the United States secretly favored a second term for him. Pérez Balladares, who attended college in the United States at the University of Notre Dame before attaining his Master's at the Wharton School of the University of Pennsylvania, reformed Panama's Labor Code, privatized Panama's telephone and electrical utilities, and ushered Panama into the World Trade Organization during his tenure. Despite massive spending by the PRD, including the hiring of Carville to craft an effective political strategy, the proposal to lift his term limitation was defeated by a margin of almost 2 to 1.

Israel, 1998–1999 

At the suggestion of President Clinton, who had grown frustrated with Benjamin Netanyahu's intransigence in the peace process, Carville, along with colleagues Bob Shrum, a speechwriter for President Clinton, and Stanley Greenberg, consulted in late 1998 and early 1999 for Labor Party candidate Ehud Barak to help him prepare for the 1999 prime ministerial election.

Carville and colleagues endeavored to help Barak seize control of the daily debate, and boost his struggling challenge to incumbent head-of-state Binyamin Netanyahu. Short declarative sentences, sound bites, rapid response, repetition, wedge issues, ethnic exploitation, nightly polling, negative research, searing attack advertisements on television, all familiar tools of American politics, arrived on the Israeli political scene during the election, as a part of what Netanyahu's director of communications, David Bar-Illan characterized as an Americanization of the election, and Netanyahu advisers implying White House meddling in an Israeli election. Barak won election by a double digit margin and served for over two years, before calling a special prime ministerial election in 2001.

Argentina, 1999 

Carville consulted for Buenos Aires Province Governor Eduardo Duhalde in his 1999 run for president of Argentina as the Justicialist Party nominee. Carville remarked in May, 1999 that U.S. Ambassador to Argentina James Cheek introduced him to Duhalde in January, 1998. Carville's consulting fee ran $30,000 per month, in 1999 US dollars, added to a percentage of campaign advertisements, plus first class airfare and hotel expenses.

Duhalde spent much of the campaign embroiled in a power struggle with his own party and incumbent President Carlos Menem who was barely dissuaded from running for a third term despite constitutional term limits, and a series of court rulings against him. The contest of campaigns was rather flat; there were no presidential debates, nor large campaign rallies, nor were any major changes in course promised by the frontrunner candidates. Duhalde emphasized his law and order credentials as a campaign theme. One television advertisement for Duhalde's campaign depicted him walking in the woods alone, talking to himself, and bemoaning all the political enemies plotting against him. Carville clashed with Duhalde's public relations team leading up to the election, which lead to his departure.

Against an economic backdrop of the Argentine Great Depression, Duhalde lost the October 1999 general election to Radical Civic Union party candidate Fernando de la Rúa who enjoyed the strategy and advice of U.S. American political consult Dick Morris (like Carville, also a former consultant to President Bill Clinton). De la Rúa would later resign during the December 2001 riots, and the Argentine Congress appointed the governor of San Luis Province Adolfo Rodríguez Saá as president. When Rodríguez Saá also resigned, Congress appointed Duhalde, who would serve as president of Argentina from January, 2002 through May, 2003.

Bolivia, 2002 

In 2002, through his firm Greenberg Carville Shrum (GCS), Carville strategized in Bolivia on behalf of Revolutionary Nationalist Movement (MNR) party presidential candidate Gonzalo "Goni" Sánchez de Lozada. The son of a political exile, Sánchez de Lozada spent his early years in Iowa, studied at the University of Chicago, and spoke Spanish with a midwestern American accent. Sanchez de Lozada served as Bolivian president in the mid 1990s, and had a record of using shock therapy, economic liberalization, and privatization. In his 2002 election campaign, he faced the first serious challenge to the hegemony of the established Bolivian political parties in the form of Evo Morales and his left-wing populist and indigenist Movement for Socialism (MAS) party.

Carville helped Sanchez de Lozada run a campaign playbook with a slick media campaign under the
slogan "Bolivia sí puede" ("Yes, Bolivia can") that featured negative attack ads on his opponents, particularly against Cochabamba mayor Manfred Reyes Villa. In one campaign advertisement, Reyes Villa was blamed for rampant diarrhea in the city's poor children.

Sanchez de Lozada garnered a plurality of votes, 22.46%, against Evo Morales second place finish at 20.94%, before coming to power in August 2002 in a coalition government formed with two other political parties. Lozada resigned in October, 2003 and fled to exile in the United States following the 2003 Bolivian Gas Conflict. Carville's work for Lozada in Bolivia was portrayed in the 2005 documentary film Our Brand Is Crisis, which inspired the 2015 narrative form film Our Brand is Crisis.

Venezuela, 2003 

 
In early 2003, Carville worked in Venezuela as an advisor to Venezuelan business interests that previously led an economically devastating strike in the spring of 2002 by managers of the national oil company, Petróleos de Venezuela, S.A. (PDVSA), in an effort to destabilize the government of leftist president Hugo Chávez. In the aftermath of an unsuccessful coup attempt in April 2002, the group sought Carville's assistance in displacing Chávez from office. In a September, 2006 interview that touched on the topic, Carville remarked: "I've worked in Venezuela and I would be very reluctant to call Chávez a democrat."

Afghanistan 2009 

Afghan presidential candidate Ashraf Ghani hired Carville as a campaign advisor in July 2009. Ghani, who renounced his US Citizenship in order to run for Presidency in Afghanistan, attended high school in the United States in Lake Oswego, Oregon during the late 1960s, earned his master's degree from Columbia University in 1977, was a Fulbright Fellow in the United States who taught at UC Berkeley, and Johns Hopkins University in the 1980s, and worked as an economist at the Washington, DC-based World Bank in the 1990s.

Ghani and Carville met in Washington in the spring of 2009 through mutual friends. Carville would not say whether he was paid to advise Ghani, whereas Ghani claimed Carville volunteered his time. Carville remarked at the time that the 2009 Afghan presidential election is "probably the most important election held in the world in a long time," and he called his new job "probably the most interesting project I have ever worked in my life." When asked about similarities between politics in Afghanistan and politics in Louisiana, Carville responded: "Yeah, I felt a little bit at home, to be honest with you." Carville's objective was to help prevent one of Ghani's opponents, Hamid Karzai from garnering a majority of votes, to force the election into a second round. Ghani garnered just 2.94% of the vote, with Kazai finishing just shy of a 50% majority. After a cancelled run-off election Karzai became president.

Colombia 2010 

In 2010, Carville worked as senior advisor to elect presidential candidate Juan Manuel Santos in Colombia. The Colombian-born Santos attended the University of Kansas for undergraduate studies from 1969 to 1973, graduating with a degree in economics and business. He returned to the U.S. as Fulbright visiting fellow at the Fletcher School of Law and Diplomacy at Tufts University in 1981, and also earned a master's degree from Harvard Kennedy School in 1981, and lectured as a Nieman Fellow at Harvard University in 1988.

Santos later joined the Washington, DC-based think tank, the Inter-American Dialogue, and served as Colombia's Minister of Trade, and Minister of Finance and Public Credit of Colombia during the 1990s and early 2000s. In 2006, then President Alvaro Uribe appointed Santos as Colombia's Minister of Defence. Santos supervised the military during a period of political tension and military action targeted at the FARC guerrilla group, including a controversial military raid on Ecuador's border, and extrajudicial assassinations during the "False positives" scandal.

Carville played a crucial role for Santos, helping him to analyze voter polls, and crafted a winning strategy, that included the night-time distribution of pamphlets under the doors of voters' homes predicting the end of popular social welfare initiatives if Santos wasn't elected.

On June 20, 2010, after two rounds of voting, Santos was elected as President of Colombia and was inaugurated on 7 August 2010 in the midst of a diplomatic crisis with Venezuela. The U.S. State Department remarked in official communications that it was "pleased" with the election of Santos, and praised the "spirited debate" before the runoff and Colombia's "longstanding commitment to democratic principles". In 2017, Santos acknowledged that his 2010 campaign received illegal payments from Brazilian conglomerate Odebrecht.

Argentina 2015 

Carville acted as advisor for Daniel Scioli's 2007 and 2011's campaigns for the governor of Buenos Aires. He also consulted for his unsuccessful presidential campaign in 2015. The election featured allegations of vote-buying, when Scioli's Front for Victory party was alleged to have distributed sacks with bottles of cooking oil, pasta and flour to Buenos Aires voters in exchange for their votes. Scioli was defeated in a November, 2015 runoff election.

John Kerry's 2004 presidential campaign 

In September, 2004, after conversations with Bill Clinton, Massachusetts Senator John Kerry engaged the assistance of Carville as an informal adviser to his 2004 presidential campaign. Rival political consultant Dick Morris speculated at the time that Carville and Greenberg, instrumental participants in the Clinton's political machine, infiltrated Kerry's campaign as a way to engineer his defeat and clear a path for Hillary Clinton to run in 2008. In the aftermath of Kerry's loss, Carville and colleagues Stanley Greenberg, as well as journalist Bob Shrum, sought to place blame on external events, including news media coverage of the Iraq War, the October, 2004 Osama bin Laden video, as well as Bush's focus on cultural issues.

2000s 

Carville co-hosted CNN's Crossfire along with associate Paul Begala from 2002 until the show's cancellation in 2005. Carville was a CNN contributor until parting ways with the network in 2013. The following year, Carville joined Fox News Channel as a contributor.

In 2005, Carville taught a semester of the course "Topics in American Politics" at Northern Virginia Community College. Among the guests he had come speak to the class were Al Hunt, Mark Halperin, Senator George Allen, George Stephanopoulos, Karl Strubel, Stan Greenberg, Tony Blankley, representatives from the Motion Picture Association of America, and James Fallows.

In 2006, Carville became a host on a sports radio show, 60/20 Sports, on XM Satellite Radio, with Luke Russert, son of NBC journalist Tim Russert. The show was an in-depth look at the culture of sports based on the difference in ages of the two hosts.

During 2006 mid-terms, then Democratic National Committee chair Howard Dean mobilized a Fifty-state strategy. Democrats won control of both houses of Congress for the first time since the 1994 election. For the first time since the creation of the Republican party in 1854, no Republican captured any House, Senate, or Gubernatorial seat previously held by a Democrat. Notwithstanding, after the election, on November 15, 2006, Carville blasted Dean's leadership as "Rumsfeldian in its incompetence," called for Dean's ouster as DNC Chair and his replacement with Harold Ford Jr., and claimed that, with a conventional strategy of piling money solely into close races, Democrats could have picked up as many as 50 House seats, roughly 20 more than they won that year. In late November 2006, Carville proposed a truce of sorts.

Carville was the executive producer of the 2006 film All the King's Men, starring Sean Penn and Anthony Hopkins, which is loosely based on the life of Louisiana Governor Huey Long.

In January, 2009, Carville predicted the execution of a peace agreement between Israel and Syria in the following 18 months, noting it would be a foreign policy priority for the incoming Obama administration. For several months in 2010, then Israeli Prime Minister Benjamin Netanyahu participated in secret, American-brokered discussions with Syria toward a peace treaty based on a full Israeli withdrawal from the Golan Heights.  The Arab Spring ensued the following year, and the treaty never came to fruition.

On March 4, 2009, Politico reported that Carville, Paul Begala, and Rahm Emanuel were the architects of the Democratic Party's strategy to cast conservative talk radio host Rush Limbaugh as the face of the Republican Party. Carville was particularly critical of Limbaugh for saying he wanted Barack Obama to "fail".

Carville was a regular contributor with Stan Greenberg to the weekly Carville-Greenberg Memo at The National Memo.

Hillary Clinton's 2008 presidential campaign 

Carville advised Hillary Clinton during her 2008 presidential campaign. In remarks on then rival candidate, Senator Barack Obama, Carville declared in 2007 that Barack Obama was the Democratic candidate "most likely to explode or implode."

On March 22, 2008, Carville compared New Mexico Governor Bill Richardson, who had just endorsed Barack Obama for the nomination, to Judas Iscariot, calling this "an act of betrayal." Carville remarked, "Mr. Richardson's endorsement came right around the anniversary of the day when Judas sold out for 30 pieces of silver, so I think the timing is appropriate, if ironic," referring to Holy week. Richardson had served President Bill Clinton as his Energy Secretary, and Ambassador to the United Nations, and Carville believed Richardson owed an endorsement to Senator Clinton. Carville also claimed Richardson assured many in the Clinton campaign that he would at least remain neutral and abstain from taking sides. Richardson denied Carville's account, arguing that he had not made any promises to remain neutral. Richardson claims that his decision to endorse Obama was "clinched" by his speech on race relations following the swirl of controversy surrounding Obama's former pastor Jeremiah Wright. Carville went on to note, "I doubt if Governor Richardson and I will be terribly close in the future," Carville said, but "I've had my say...I got one in the wheelhouse and I tagged it."

Even as Clinton's campaign began to lose steam, Carville remained both loyal and positive in his public positions, rarely veering off message and stoutly defending the candidate. However, on May 13, 2008, a few hours before the primary in West Virginia, Carville remarked to an audience at Furman University in South Carolina, "I'm for Senator Clinton, but I think the great likelihood is that Obama will be the nominee." The moment marked a shift from his previous and often determinedly optimistic comments about the state of Clinton's campaign.

After Barack Obama's clear lead for victory in the Democratic presidential campaign on June 3, James Carville said he was ready to open up his wallet to help Obama build a political war chest to take on John McCain in November.

2010s 

Carville was retained by Palantir Technologies as a paid adviser in 2011, and was instrumental in bringing about Palantir's collaboration with the New Orleans Police Department to quietly deploy predictive policing software in New Orleans.

Carville has criticized Obama's political style and demeanor over the years. On November 18th, 2010, Carville spoke to an audience at a Christian Science Monitor breakfast and remarked: "If Hillary gave up one of her balls and gave it to Obama, he'd have two." Carville made a similar remark to political journalist Eleanor Clift during the midst of the primaries in May, 2008, insinuating that Hillary Clinton was a tougher candidate, remarking: "If she gave him one of her cojones, they'd both have two."

In November 2013, in light of President Barack Obama's declining approval poll numbers, Carville commented "I think the best thing he can do is take a toke on the mayor of Toronto's crack pipe, because his numbers are about 48."

On October 21, 2018 Carville participated with Fox News pundit Tucker Carlson at the 2018 PoltiCon in Los Angeles in "A conversation with Eddie Izzard", an event chaired by the British comedian.

Carville joined the faculty of Louisiana State University's Manship School of Mass Communication in January 2018. His work at the Manship School was supported by philanthropic gifts. He has also lectured in political science at Tulane University.

In 2019, political pundit Mark Halperin consulted with Carville for his upcoming book, How to Beat Trump: America's Top Political Strategists on What It Will Take. Carville was asked what he would tell Halperin's sexual assault victims, who have expressed disappointment and outrage that so many top Democrats were willing to talk with someone accused of such serious allegations, and remarked: "I know he's been accused by a lot of people and lost his job. The guy called me and asked me to speak to him on a topic that I obviously care about. And I spoke to him."

2020s

Michael Bennet's 2020 presidential campaign 

In January 2020, Carville endorsed Colorado Senator Michael Bennet's ultimately unsuccessful campaign for the Democratic presidential nomination. Carville appeared on stage with Bennet leading up to the 2020 New Hampshire Democratic presidential primary at his political events in the state. Carville remarked of Bennet during the campaign season: "This is John Kennedy recloned, you can't get any better than this guy!" Bennet, who leaned hard on Carville's endorsement, garnered 963 votes in New Hampshire, or 0.3% of 300,022 total Democratic ballots cast in a year of record-shattering turnout.

2020 election cycle 

Carville has also entered the podcast business, and, along with Al Hunt hosts 2020 Politics War Room, which purports to offer "a backstage pass to impeachment and the 2020 Election." He continues to make frequent appearances with Brian Williams in MSNBC cable news programming to comment on the 2020 Democratic debates, caucuses and primaries, and the trajectory of the 2020 Democratic nomination and general election.

In February 2020, Carville suggested jettisoning the Democratic presidential primaries and caucuses, letting House Speaker Nancy Pelosi select the Democratic Party's presidential and vice-presidential candidates, and suggested Mitt Romney should "resign from the Senate to save the Democratic Party's ass, and run our convention." Carville further added he might cast a write in vote for Nancy Pelosi when he votes in Louisiana.
 
In February 2020 media appearances and interviews, against a backdrop of presidential candidate Bernie Sanders' rise in the polls, Carville expressed his displeasure at the prospect of Sanders being nominated, branded Sanders as a "communist" and pejoratively labeled Sanders' base of support as a "cult", warning of the "end of days" if Sanders were to win the Democratic nomination. Carville used his media appearances surrounding the dustup to rail against the ascendance of progressive populist Democratic policy positions such as student loan debt forgiveness and "people voting from jail cells." Carville also decried banning hydraulic fracking for shale gas.

In November 2020, Carville predicted that the result of the presidential election would be known by 10p.m. on election day. After the Associated Press took an additional four days to declare the winner, Politico named Carville's prediction among "the most audacious, confident and spectacularly incorrect prognostications about the year".

Pennsylvania Senate election, 2022 

In 2022, Carville led the "Penn Progress" Super Pac, which spent the entirety of its funds in support of Rep. Conor Lamb's bid for the U.S. Senate seat vacated by retiring senator Pat Toomey. Lamb worked closely with Carville's SuperPac, and participated in donor calls Carville arranged. 

Carville's Super PAC bankrolled TV ads which sought to portray one of Lamb's primary opponents, Lieutenant Governor John Fetterman as a "self-described democratic socialist." Within a day of airing, PolitiFact and Factcheck.org called the attack ad false, The Philadelphia Inquirer commented that Fetterman had never actually described himself that way., the ABC affiliate in Philadelphia, stopped broadcasting the ad, and Senator Elizabeth Warren called on Lamb to disavow it. Echoing a fanciful attack by Pennsylvania Republican Party chairman Val DiGiorgio, Carville himself re-tweeted news coverage on Fetterman being labeled a "silver spoon socialist."

Public speaking 

In 2004, The New York Times noted that Carville was making more than 100 speeches per year to various audiences, including business groups, colleges and universities and Democratic Party fundraising events. Charles Lewis, executive director at the Center for Public Integrity, a Washington research group, remarked that "No political consultant has carved a space as unique as his." Fred Wertheimer, president of Democracy 21, said at the time: "He's become a commodity of himself by design. He's a walking conglomerate." Joe Lockhart, a former press secretary to Bill Clinton, characterized Carville as "a multimedia corporation, and he's been smart about it. He is a model of the future. This could not have happened pre-1992 when campaign consultants were viewed by a small audience. Now they are public celebrities." Carville was noted to have been represented exclusively by the Washington Speakers Bureau, with a speaker's fee of $20,500 in 2004 to get him to the podium for an hour, plus first-class expenses and top accommodations.

Commercial endorsements and advertisements 
Carville had an array of commercial endorsements, and starred in print media and television advertisements for leading consumer brands including Coca-Cola, Little Debbie snacks, Maker's Mark bourbon, Heineken beer, Alka-Seltzer antacid, American Express credit cards, Nike shoes, the Cotton Council, and Ariba software.

In 2000, through Bob Chlopak's and Peter Schechter's Chlopak, Leonard, Schechter & Associates (CLS), a Washington, DC-based public relations firm, Carville enjoyed a sponsorship with Playboy media and Captain Morgan rum, which included a trip to Hugh Hefner's Playboy mansion.

Personal life 
Carville is married to political consultant Mary Matalin, who worked for Republican George H. W. Bush on his 1992 presidential re-election campaign. Carville and Matalin were married in New Orleans in October 1993. They have two daughters. In 2008, Carville and Matalin relocated their family from Virginia to New Orleans.

 Carville has attention deficit hyperactivity disorder and has spoken publicly about ADHD for organizations like Children and Adults with Attention-Deficit Hyperactivity Disorder.

Books 
Politics
All's Fair: Love, War and Running for President (1995), with Mary Matalin and Peter Knobler
We're Right, They're Wrong: A Handbook for Spirited Progressives (1996)
...And The Horse He Rode In On: The People vs. Kenneth Starr (1998)
Stickin: The Case for Loyalty (2000) with Paul Begala
Suck Up, Buck Up... and Come Back When You Foul Up (2001)
Had Enough? (2004)
 Take It Back: Our Party, Our Country, Our Future (2006) with Paul Begala
40 More Years: How the Democrats Will Rule the Next Generation (2009)
It's the Middle Class, Stupid! (2012) with Stan Greenberg
 Love & War: Twenty Years, Three Presidents, Two Daughters and One Louisiana Home, (2014) with Mary Matalin
 We're Still Right, They're Still Wrong: The Democrats' Case for 2016 (2016)

Children's fiction
Lu and the Swamp Ghost (2004) with co-author Patricia McKissack and illustrator David Catrow

Film and television appearances
Carville takes a lead role in The War Room, a documentary about Bill Clinton's 1992 presidential campaign, together with George Stephanopoulos.
He appeared in the 1996 film The People vs. Larry Flynt as Hamilton County Prosecuting Attorney Simon Leis.
He appeared in three episodes of the sitcom Mad About You playing himself, as head of a political consulting firm that hires Jamie Buchman, played by Helen Hunt.
He has a guest role on the sitcom Spin City, where he is interviewed for a job as campaign manager.
Carville reportedly accepted the role of Crazy Ray in the cancelled animated Walt Disney Animation Studios film My Peoples, which was later re-titled A Few Good Ghosts.
In the films Old School and Wedding Crashers, Carville makes cameo appearances as himself.
He appeared as himself in Our Brand Is Crisis, a documentary about the Bolivian presidential election.
Carville appears as the Governor of Missouri, Thomas Crittenden, in the 2007 movie The Assassination of Jesse James by the Coward Robert Ford.
He appeared as himself in NBC's comedy 30 Rock, in season 2 episode 8, "Secrets and Lies".
He appeared in cartoon form in the Family Guy episode "Running Mates."
He starred in Steven Soderbergh's HBO series K Street, along with his wife.
Carville is a regular guest on The Tony Kornheiser Show, where he picks both NFL and college football games against the USA Today spreads.
He voiced Judge Roland McFarlane in the King of the Hill episode "Jumpin' Crack Bass".
He made a cameo appearance in The Muppets.
Beginning in 2012, Carville and Matalin appeared in "Cocktail Party" commercials for Maker's Mark Kentucky Straight Bourbon.
Carville appears as himself in the film G.I. Joe: Retaliation, introducing the President at a fundraising event.
He was portrayed on Saturday Night Live, mostly by Bill Hader.
He was also portrayed by Hader in "The Bunker", an episode of the "mockumentary" series Documentary Now which parodies his appearance in The War Room.
He and his wife perform the epilogue to Hayes Carll's political comedy song "Another Like You".
He and his wife appeared about their participation in the Clinton and Bush campaigns of the 1992 presidential election in the documentary series Race for the White House.

References

Further reading
 Clinton, Bill (2004). My Life. Vintage. .
 Bridges, Tyler, and Jeremy Alford (2016). Long Shot: A Soldier, a Senator, a Serious Sin, an Epic Louisiana Election. .

External links

 
 
 
 

1944 births
American campaign managers
American people of Belgian descent
American political consultants
American political commentators
American political writers
American male non-fiction writers
Cajun people
Clinton administration personnel
Living people
Louisiana Democrats
Louisiana lawyers
Louisiana State University alumni
Louisiana State University Law Center alumni
People from Iberville Parish, Louisiana
Tulane University faculty
United States Marine Corps non-commissioned officers
United States presidential advisors
Writers from New Orleans
Mason Fellows